Brian Keenan may refer to:
Brian Keenan (writer) (born 1950), Belfast writer held as a hostage in Lebanon from 1986 to 1990
Brian Keenan (Irish republican) (1942–2008), Provisional Irish Republican Army member
Brian Keenan (musician, born 1943) (1943–1985), American  musician
Brian Keenan (musician, born 1982), American musician